Asphodelin A is an antimicrobial arylcoumarin made by Asphodelus microcarpus.

References

Antimicrobials
Coumarins